This is a list of rivers in Bolivia.

By drainage basin
This list is arranged by drainage basin, with respective tributaries indented under each larger stream's name.

Rivers that reach the ocean

Amazon Basin
 Madeira River
 Abuná River
 Río Negro
 Pacahuaras River
 Mapiri River
 Rapirrán River
 Chipamanu River
 Xipamanu River
 Beni River including Alto Beni
 Orthon River
 Tahuamanu River
 Muymano River
 Mamuripi River
 Manuripe River
 Madre de Dios River
 Sena River
 San Martín River
 Manuripi River
 Heath River
 Tambopata River
 Ivón River
 Arroyo Verde
 Madidi River
 Esmeralda River
 Claro River
 Tuichi River
 Yariapo River
 Pelechuco River
 Quiquibey River  
 Kaka River
 Coroico River
 Camata River
 Zongo River
 Mapiri River
Challana River
 Tipuani River
 Atén River
 Consata River
 San Cristóbal River
 Boopi River
 Tamapaya River
 La Paz River
 Choqueyapu River
 Santa Elena River
 Altamachi River
 Cotacajes River
 Río Negro
 Sacambaya River
 Amutara River
 Ayopaya River
 Colquiri River
 Leque River
 Sayarani River
 Tallija River
 Mamoré River including Mamorecillo
 Yata River
 Benicito River
 Iténez (Guaporé) River
 Itonomas River or San Miguel or San Julián or San Pablo
 Machupo River
 Quizer River
 Parapetí River usually ends in the Bañados de Izozog depression
 Cañón Verde River
 Santa Bárbara River
 Río Blanco or Baures or Agua Caliente
 San Martin River
 Negro River or San Joaquin
 San Simón River
 Paraguá River
 San Ramón River
 Tarvo River
 Verde River
 Paucerna River
 San Agustín River
 Yacuma River
 Rápulo River
 Maniqui River
 San Geronimo River
 Bio River
 Apere River
 Matos River
 Curico River
 Tijamuchi River
 Ibare River
 Isiboro River
 Sécure River
 Ichoa River
 Chipiriri River
 Tayota River
 Río Grande or Guapay
 Yapacaní River
 Palacios River
 Alturas del Yapacaní River
 Surutú River
 Paila River
 Piray River
 Bermejo River
 Piojeras River
 Azero River
 Mizque River
Julpe River
 Tomina River
 Charobamba River
 Chico River
 San Pedro River
 Chayanta River
 Caine River
 Arque River
 Rocha River
 Chapare River
 Espíritu Santo River
 San Matéo River
 Ichilo River includes Alto Ichilo
 Useuta River
 Choré River
 Ibabo River
 Chimoré River
 Sacta River
 Víbora River
 San Matéo River
 Moija River
 Purus River (Brazil)
 Acre River

La Plata Basin
 Paraná River (Argentina)
 Paraguay River
 Bermejo River
 Río Grande de Tarija
 Itaú River
 Tarija River
 Salinas River
 Camacho River
 Guadalquivir River
 Pilcomayo River
 Pilaya River
 San Juan del Oro River
 Tupiza River
 Tumusla River
 Yura River
 Callama River
 San Juan River
 Qaysa River
 Cotagaita River
 Río Blanco
 Camargo River
 Inka Wasi River
 Parapetí River usually ends in the Bañados de Izozog depression
 Bamburral River or Negro
 Tucavaca River
 San Rafael River
 Curiche Grande River
 Río de la Fortuna

Pacific Ocean
 Loa River (Chile)
 San Pedro de Inacaliri River (Chile)
 Silala River

Endorheic basins in the Altiplano

Poopó Lake 
 Desaguadero River
 Mauri River
 Lake Titicaca
 Suches River
 Márquez River

Lake Coipasa or Salar de Coipasa
 Laq'a Jawira
 Lauca River
 Sajama River
Sabaya River

Salar de Uyuni 
 Puka Mayu
 Río Grande de Lipez
 Río Colorado

References
Rand McNally, The New International Atlas, 1993.
 GEOnet Names Server
Hydrographic Maps of Bolivia

Bolivia
 
Rivers of Bolivia